Pietro Ducros (1745  –  February, 1810) was a Swiss-Italian painter and engraver active in Rome.

Biography
He trained in Switzerland, and mainly produced landscapes, moving to Rome as an adult, where he formed a friendship with Giovanni Volpato. Together, they assembled a series of vedute of the city and surrounding countryside. He then joined with Paolo Montagnari to publish 24 vedute of Sicily and Malta. Both these publication met with success.

The series with Montagnari included vedute of Palermo, near Monreale; of the Theater of Taormina; of the Etna volcano; of the Amphitheater of Siracusa, of the Interior of the city of Messina after the earthquake of 1783, and of the Port of the galleys of the Arsenal of Malta.

He retired and died in Lausanne.

References

1745 births
1810 deaths
18th-century Italian painters
Italian male painters
19th-century Italian painters
Swiss painters
Italian landscape painters
19th-century Italian male artists
18th-century Italian male artists